C.D. Atletico Chispa is a Honduran football club, based in San Pedro Sula, Honduras.

They currently play in Liga Mayor, the third tier of the Honduran football pyramid.

References

Football clubs in Honduras